The 2022 Copa América de Beach Soccer (known natively in Spanish as the Copa América de Futbol Playa) was the third edition of the Copa América de Beach Soccer, an international beach soccer competition in South America, contested between the men's national teams of the members of CONMEBOL.

The competition was organised by South American football's governing body, CONMEBOL; other beach soccer events under the "Copa América" title took place during 1994–99, 2003 and 2012–14, however this incarnation is the first to be officially organised and sanctioned by CONMEBOL.

The tournament was hosted by Paraguay in Luque (Asunción), between 21 and 29 May. The tournament returned for the first time in four years after the last scheduled edition in 2020 was cancelled due to the effects of the COVID-19 pandemic in South America.

Brazil were the two-time defending champions, but lost in the final to hosts Paraguay who won their first ever title, and claimed the first CONMEBOL competition victory by any senior Paraguayan team since the 1979 Copa América.

Teams 
Teams representing all 10 members of CONMEBOL took part.

Venue
One venue was used in the city of Luque, part of the Greater Asunción area, on the grounds of the Paraguayan Olympic Committee headquarters.

Squads
Each team had to submit a squad of no less than 10 and no more than 12 players, including a minimum of two goalkeepers (Regulations Article 28). In consideration of the ongoing COVID-19 pandemic, any of these registered players who become afflicted by the disease could be freely replaced before the tournament began (Regulations Article 33).

Draw 
The draw to split the ten teams into two groups of five took place at 12:00 PYT (UTC–4) on 4 May at CONMEBOL headquarters in Luque, Paraguay, under the following procedure:

The teams were seeded based on their final ranking in the previous edition of the tournament in 2018.

Initially, two teams were automatically assigned to position one of the groups:

 to Group A: as the hosts, 
 to Group B: as the top seeds, 

The remaining eight teams were split into four pots of two based on their seeding, in order from the highest seeds placed in Pot 1, down to the lowest seeds placed in Pot 4. From each pot, the first team drawn was placed into Group A and the second team drawn was placed into Group B.

The draw resulted in the following groups:

Group stage
The top two teams of each group advanced to the semi finals. The teams finishing in third through fifth proceeded to play in consolation matches against the teams finishing in the same position in the other group to determine their final rank.

Each team earns three points for a win in regulation time, two points for a win in extra time, one point for a win in a penalty shoot-out, and no points for a defeat (Regulations Article 19).

If two or more teams are equal on points, their rankings are determined as follows (Regulations Article 20):

Matches are listed as local time in Luque, PYT (UTC–4).

The schedule was published after the draw. 24 May is allocated as a rest day.

Group A

Group B

Placement matches
27 May is allocated as a rest day.

Ninth place play-off

Seventh place play-off

Fifth place play-off

Knockout stage
27 May is allocated as a rest day.

Semi-finals

Third place play-off

Final

Winners

Final standings

Source

References

External links
Copa América de Fútbol Playa, at CONMEBOL.com (in Spanish)
CONMEBOL Copa América de Fútbol Playa Paraguay 2022, at the Paraguayan Football Association (in Spanish)

2022
2022 in Paraguayan football
2022
2022 in beach soccer
May 2022 sports events in South America
2022 in South American football